Asher Blinkoff (born November 23, 2008) is an American teen actor. He is best known for his role as Dennis in the Hotel Transylvania film franchise for Columbia Pictures and Sony Pictures Animation.

Career 
Asher Blinkoff is the son of Marion and Saul Andrew Blinkoff. Blinkoff made his feature film debut at age 6 in Hotel Transylvania 2. He also voiced in various films such as The Jungle Book, Sing 2, and others.

Personal life 
Blinkoff has an older sister named Meira who is a voice actress.

Filmography

Live-action

Animation

References

External links

2008 births
Living people
American male child actors
American male voice actors
People from Delaware County, Pennsylvania